Graham Eric Stringer (born 17 February 1950) is a British Labour Party politician serving as MP for Blackley and Broughton since 1997. Before entering Parliament, he served as leader of Manchester City Council from 1984 to 1996, and chair of Manchester Airport plc from 1996 to 1997. 
Stringer is a prominent Eurosceptic.

Early life
Stringer attended Christ Church Primary School in Beswick, Manchester, and Openshaw Technical High School for Boys in Openshaw, Manchester. After graduating in Chemistry from the University of Sheffield in 1971, Stringer worked as an analytical chemist in the plastics industry. Stringer became a local councillor in Manchester in 1979, and was Manchester City Council leader from 1984 to 1996. He was also chair of Manchester Airport from 1996 to 1997.

Parliamentary career
Stringer was first elected in 1997 taking over the Blackley seat of the retired Kenneth Eastham. He is only the third Member of Parliament (MP) in the constituency since 1964, which has been a Labour seat since Paul Rose defeated Eric Johnson that year.

Stringer was a member of the Environment, Transport and Regional Affairs Select Committee until 1999. He then served as Parliamentary Secretary to the Cabinet Office until 2001. After a spell on the back benches and as a government whip, he spent the last six years of the Labour Government as a member of the Transport Select Committee. He campaigned against a proposed Congestion Charge in Greater Manchester. In 2008, Stringer became the first Labour MP to publicly call for Gordon Brown to resign as Prime Minister.

In 2009, Stringer denied the existence of dyslexia, calling it "a cruel fiction" invented by "the education establishment" to divert blame for illiteracy from "their eclectic and incomplete methods for instruction". The charities Dyslexia Action and the British Dyslexia Association criticised Stringer's claims.

Following boundary changes which abolished the Manchester Blackley constituency, Stringer successfully contested the successor seat of Blackley and Broughton at the 2010 General Election.

In 2011, he called for Manchester United manager Sir Alex Ferguson, a lifelong Labour voter and vocal supporter of the party at elections, to be given a seat in the House of Lords. Two years later, Ed Miliband offered Ferguson a seat in the House of Lords but he turned it down. He also contributed to the book What Next for Labour? Ideas for a New Generation; his piece was entitled "Transport Policy for the Twenty-First Century".

He is a trustee of the Global Warming Policy Foundation, an organisation which promotes climate change denialism. As a member of the Science and Technology Committee, Stringer participated in the investigation into the Climatic Research Unit email controversy ("Climategate") in 2010, questioning Phil Jones closely on transparency and other issues; in the five member group producing the report he voted against the other three voting members on every vote, representing a formulation more critical of the CRU and climate scientists.

In an op-ed in 2011, Stringer criticised the British inquiries into the CRU email controversy, writing that the controversy "demanded independent and objective scrutiny of the science by independent panels. This did not happen." Stringer was a member of the Energy and Climate Change Select Committee from 2013 to 2015. In 2014, Stringer was one of two MPs on the committee to vote against the acceptance of the Intergovernmental Panel of Climate Change conclusion that humans are the dominant cause of global warming.

In 2014, he, along with 98 others, voted for the Dominic Raab amendment to the Immigration Bill, which aimed to prevent foreign criminals using European Human Rights Law in deportation cases.

He was a critic of former Labour Party leader Ed Miliband, who he accused of running an "unforgivably unprofessional" campaign, and referred to as "not an asset on the doorsteps" when campaigning in 2014.

Stringer has established a reputation as a prominent Eurosceptic in the Labour Party who favoured a referendum on the EU. He called for Britain to leave the EU in the 2016 Referendum, describing the EU as a barrier to a progressive government. On 17 July 2018, a vote was held on whether the United Kingdom should remain in the customs union in the event of a no deal Brexit. Frank Field, Kate Hoey, John Mann and Stringer were the only Labour MPs to oppose the amendment, which was voted down by 307 votes to 301.

He is a member of Labour Friends of Israel.

On 21 October 2020, during the COVID-19 pandemic, Stringer was the only Labour MP to vote against implementing stricter lockdown in the North West of England, an area which includes his own constituency in Greater Manchester.

Personal life
In 1999, he married Kathryn Carr; they have three children. In the 2021 BBC One drama The Trick, a dramatisation of the Climategate scandal, Stringer was portrayed by Andrew Dunn.

References

External links
 
 Guardian Unlimited Politics – Ask Aristotle: Graham Stringer MP
 Bio at the Labour Party website
 BBC Politics 
 

1950 births
Living people
Alumni of the University of Sheffield
Councillors in Manchester
Labour Party (UK) councillors
Labour Party (UK) MPs for English constituencies
People educated at Moston Brook High School
Labour Friends of Israel
UK MPs 1997–2001
UK MPs 2001–2005
UK MPs 2005–2010
UK MPs 2010–2015
UK MPs 2015–2017
UK MPs 2017–2019
UK MPs 2019–present
Leaders of local authorities of England
British Eurosceptics